Goff Island is an island on Seventh Lake in Hamilton County, New York. It is named after brothers Frederick Harris Goff (banker, who established the Cleveland Foundation) and Isaac Channing Goff (industrialist), who built vacation camps on the island circa 1900.

References

Islands of New York (state)